Ferhat Korkmaz (born 14 September 1981) is a Swedish-born Turkish footballer who plays for Väsby United as a defender.

References

External links

1981 births
Living people
Association football defenders
IF Brommapojkarna players
Turkish footballers
Syrianska FC players
AFC Eskilstuna players
Vasalunds IF players
Swedish people of Turkish descent